Mount William Booth was named in 1965 after William Booth, the founder of the Salvation Army. It is part of the Ram Range in Alberta, Canada, and situated near the southern end of Abraham Lake. It is located in the North Saskatchewan River valley of the Canadian Rockies, and can be seen from the David Thompson Highway east of Saskatchewan Crossing.

Climate

Based on the Köppen climate classification, Mount William Booth is located in a subarctic climate with cold, snowy winters, and mild summers. Temperatures can drop below -20 °C with wind chill factors below -30 °C.

See also
List of mountains of Canada
Geography of Alberta

References

Two-thousanders of Alberta
Alberta's Rockies